The St. Michel nesophontes (Nesophontes paramicrus) is an extinct species of mammal in the family Nesophontidae. It was endemic to Hispaniola (today Haiti and the Dominican Republic).

Taxonomy
A phylogenetic study in 2016, based on DNA extracted and carbon-dated from a specimen about 750 years old, suggests their nearest relatives are the solenodons, although the two groups diverged more than 40 million years ago.

History
The type specimen was collected in Cueva de Bosque Humido, Los Haitises National Park, Hato Mayor Province, Dominican Republic.

References

Nesophontes
Holocene extinctions
Mammals of Hispaniola
Extinct animals of the Dominican Republic
Mammals of the Dominican Republic
Mammals of Haiti
Mammals of the Caribbean
Extinct animals of Haiti
Mammals described in 1929
Mammal extinctions since 1500
Taxonomy articles created by Polbot